S. leucantha may refer to:
 Salvia leucantha, the Mexican bush sage, a herbaceous perennial plant species native to Mexico
 Sideritis leucantha, a plant species